This article refers to sports broadcasting contracts in Northern Cyprus. For a list of broadcasting rights in other countries, see Sports television broadcast contracts.

Sport Channels
 BRT 1
 BRT 2

BRT is the state television of the Turkish Republic of Northern Cyprus. BRT is also the oldest Turkish Cypriot TV channel, established as a radio station in 1963, and launched its first television broadcast in 1976. Most of the TV channels in Northern Cyprus also broadcast via satellite, and there is a "Cyprus Packet" in the satellite of Türksat.

Football
K-Pet Super League of Northern Cyprus is broadcast via BRT

Basketball

Cycling
 International Cycling Championship of Northern Cypus: BRT

References

Northern Cyprus
Sport in Northern Cyprus
Mass media in Northern Cyprus